"Facing a Miracle" is the official theme song to the 2010 Gay Games. Dayne performed the song to an audience of 50,000 fans on July 31, 2010 in Cologne, Germany. It ended the year at #9 on Perfect Beat's Top Worldwide Singles of 2010.

The song was given a hard tribal club remix in 2010 by U.S. producers Joel Dickinson, John Michael & Billy Waters featuring the vocals of African a cappella group Il Quinto.

The song was remixed again in October 2010 by Swedish DJ/producer LA Rush.

References

2010 singles
2010 songs
Gay Games
Taylor Dayne songs